John Campbell (born November 2, 1962) is an alpine skier from Saint John who competed in the 1992 Winter Olympics who participated in the slalom, the giant slalom, and the super giant slalom. He has a daughter, Jasmine Campbell who competed in the 2014 Olympics in the slalom and giant slalom, with her father as coach. She was the flag bearer for the U.S. Virgin Islands

Results

References

1962 births
Living people
United States Virgin Islands male alpine skiers
Alpine skiers at the 1992 Winter Olympics
Olympic alpine skiers of the United States Virgin Islands
People from Saint John, U.S. Virgin Islands